George Melville Furr (14 August 1885 – 2 January 1967) was an English professional footballer who played as an outside right in the Football League for Manchester City.

Personal life 
Furr's three brothers, Harry, Vic and Willie, also played professional football and his son played football as an amateur. His sisters Amelia and Miriam married footballers William Grimes and George Payne respectively. Furr followed his father into fishmongery and built up a number of fishmongers and chip shops across Hertfordshire.

Career statistics

References

1885 births
1967 deaths
Footballers from the London Borough of Barnet
English footballers
Association football outside forwards
Hitchin Town F.C. players
Biggleswade Town F.C. players
Watford F.C. players
Manchester City F.C. players
Croydon Common F.C. players
Southern Football League players
English Football League players